The Leica CL is a 35mm compact rangefinder camera with interchangeable lenses in the Leica M-mount. It was developed in collaboration with Minolta who manufactured it.  It first appeared in April 1973 and was released in the Japanese market in November 1973 as the Leitz Minolta CL. Both the Leica CL and Leitz Minolta CL were manufactured in a new Minolta factory in Osaka. In 2017, Leica announced a new digital mirrorless camera, again named Leica CL.

Description
The Leica CL has a vertical-running focal plane shutter, with cloth curtains, giving ½ to 1/1000 speeds. There is a through-the-lens CdS exposure meter mounted on a pivoting arm just in front of the shutter, like the Leica M5. The exposure is manual and the shutter is mechanical. The shutter speeds are visible in the finder. The finder's framelines are for a 40mm, 50mm or 90mm lens. The 40mm and 50mm framelines are always present and the 90mm frame line is automatically selected upon mounting of the appropriate lens.

Today the CL is a superbly compact and more affordable camera on which to mount M-mount lenses, but it does not have a rangefinder as precise as that of any Leica M body. The rangefinder base of the CL is 31.5 mm and the viewfinder magnification is 0.60, leading to a small effective rangefinder base of 18.9 mm. This is too short for accurate focusing with lenses longer than 90mm and fast lenses used at full aperture. Some users report the camera is rather fragile, especially the rangefinder alignment and meter mechanism.

Lenses

The CL was sold with two lenses specially designed for it: the Leitz Summicron-C 40mm f:2 sold as the normal lens, and the Leitz Elmar-C 90mm f:4 long lens. Both take the uncommon Series 5.5 filters. A Leitz Elmarit-C 40mm f:2.8 was also briefly produced but it is said that only 400 were made.

The lenses specially designed for the Leica CL can physically mount on a Leica M body, but Leica recommended not doing so because it would not give the best focusing precision, allegedly because the coupling cam of the C and M lenses is not the same. However, some people say that it is unimportant and that they can be used perfectly well on an M.

When sold with a Leitz Minolta CL, the lenses were called Minolta M-Rokkor 40mm f:2 (later just Minolta M-Rokkor 40mm f:2) and Minolta M-Rokkor 90mm f:4. It is said that the 40mm was made in Japan by Minolta while the 90mm was made by Leitz and is rare. With the later Minolta CLE, Minolta would produce lenses of the same name but with a different coupling system, the same as the Leica M lenses. A new Minolta M-Rokkor 28mm f:2.8 lens was introduced as well. All these lenses can be mounted on the CL too. Rokkor-branded lenses for the CL and CLE take the more easily found 40.5mm filter size.

The CL can take nearly all the Leica M lenses. Exception are some lenses that protrude deep into the body and could hurt the meter arm, these include: 15mm/8 Hologon, 21mm/4 Super Angulon, 28mm/2.8 Elmarits before serial number 2314921. The eyed lenses, including the M3 wide-angle lenses, the 135mm/2.8 Elmarit, and the 50mm/2 Dual Range Summicron, cannot be mounted either because they are incompatible with the body shape. The 90mm/2 Summicron and 135mm/4 Tele-Elmar are incompatible too. The collapsible lenses can be mounted but they must not be fully collapsed, and Leitz advised to stick to the barrel an adhesive strip of adequate width, to limit the collapsing movement. Another limitation is that the rangefinder is only coupled until 0.8m.

Production
Sixty-five thousand serial numbers were allotted to the Leica CL, and this number does not include the Leitz Minolta CL. 3,500 examples of the CL received a special 50 Jahre marking in 1975, for Leica's 50th anniversary. It is also said that 50 demonstration examples were made. They are completely operational, with the top plate cut away to show the internal mechanism.

References

Further reading
 Classic Camera, no. 1, January 1997. Milano: Editrice Progresso.
 Francesch, Dominique and Jean-Paul. Histoire de l'appareil photographique Minolta de 1929 à 1985. Paris: Dessain et Tolra, 1985. 
 Kisselbach, Theo. Leica CL. Heering-Verlag, 1976. . In German; published one year later in English by Hove. .
Lewis, Gordon, ed. The History of the Japanese Camera. Rochester, N.Y.: George Eastman House, International Museum of Photography & Film, 1991.  (paper),  (hard)  P. 141.

External links

 Downloadable documents in the Leica CL page at summilux.net: user manual, brochure and leaflet about the M and CL lens compatibility
 Leica CL brochure (ref. 112-92) in English and Leitz Minolta CL brochure in Japanese at Camera Instruction Manuals Online

CL
CL
Leica rangefinder cameras
135 film cameras

de:Leica CL